Didyr is a department or commune of Sanguié Province in central Burkina Faso. Its capital is the town of Didyr.

Towns and villages
The département consists of one town :
 Didyr
and 15 villages :

References

Departments of Burkina Faso
Sanguié Province